Leland is a city in Winnebago County, Iowa, United States. The population was 249 at the time of the 2020 census.

History
Leland was platted in 1887, and named for one of its founders, John D. Leland. Leland was incorporated as a city in 1894.

Geography
Leland is located at  (43.333668, -93.637435).

Demographics

2010 census
As of the census of 2010, there were 289 people, 119 households, and 76 families residing in the city. The racial makeup of the city was 93.4% White, 1.0% African American, 1.0% Native American, 1.4% Asian, 2.4% from other races, and 0.7% from two or more races. Hispanic or Latino of any race were 5.5% of the population.

There were 119 households, of which 31.9% had children under the age of 18 living with them, 48.7% were married couples living together, 6.7% had a female householder with no husband present, 8.4% had a male householder with no wife present, and 36.1% were non-families. 27.7% of all households were made up of individuals, and 6.7% had someone living alone who was 65 years of age or older. The average household size was 2.43 and the average family size was 3.00.

The median age in the city was 40.8 years. 25.6% of residents were under the age of 18; 8.3% were between the ages of 18 and 24; 20.7% were from 25 to 44; 32.6% were from 45 to 64; and 12.8% were 65 years of age or older. The gender makeup of the city was 52.6% male and 47.4% female.

2000 census
As of the census of 2000, there were 258 people, 110 households, and 75 families residing in the city. The racial makeup of the city was 96.12% White, 0.78% Native American, 1.55% Asian, 0.78% from other races, and 0.78% from two or more races. Hispanic or Latino of any race were 3.49% of the population.

There were 110 households, out of which 34.5% had children under the age of 18 living with them, 53.6% were married couples living together, 11.8% had a female householder with no husband present, and 31.8% were non-families. 25.5% of all households were made up of individuals, and 10.0% had someone living alone who was 65 years of age or older. The average household size was 2.35 and the average family size was 2.83.

In the city, the population was spread out, with 26.4% under the age of 18, 7.8% from 18 to 24, 28.3% from 25 to 44, 26.7% from 45 to 64, and 10.9% who were 65 years of age or older. The median age was 38 years. For every 100 females, there were 85.6 males. For every 100 females age 18 and over, there were 81.0 males.

The median income for a household in the city was $35,000, and the median income for a family was $40,000. Males had a median income of $29,250 versus $21,406 for females. The per capita income for the city was $16,175. About 2.8% of families and 7.2% of the population were below the poverty line, including 11.5% of those under the age of eighteen and 9.1% of those 65 or over.

Education
Residents are part of the Forest City Community School District.

Popular culture
Leland is the subject of a song by Kevin Costner & Modern West.

Notable person  

 Terry E. Branstad (born 1946) United States Ambassador, formerly the 39th and 42nd Governor of Iowa.

References

External links
 

YouTube Kevin Costner & Modern West singing Leland, Iowa in Leland
City-Data Comprehensive Statistical Data and more about Leland

Cities in Iowa
Cities in Winnebago County, Iowa
1887 establishments in Iowa